is a life simulation video game and a sequel to Disney Magical World. The game was released for the Nintendo 3DS on November 5, 2015 in Japan and in October 2016 in North America, Europe, and Australia. Compared to its predecessor, the game added new features, costumes, worlds, and more characters. The theme song for the game is "Sparkle ~Kagayaki wo Shinjite~" by May J.

A remastered version for the Nintendo Switch console, titled Disney Magical World 2: Enchanted Edition, was released on December 3, 2021.

Gameplay 

Disney Magical World 2 is a life simulation game. Features from its predecessor include building furniture, clothing and using ingredients, as well as new features such as riding a boat. The game adds new characters from Mickey Mouse and Friends, The Three Little Pigs, Snow White and the Seven Dwarfs, Pinocchio, Fantasia, The Three Caballeros, Cinderella, Alice in Wonderland, Peter Pan, Sleeping Beauty, The Aristocats, Winnie the Pooh, The Little Mermaid, Beauty and the Beast, Aladdin, The Nightmare Before Christmas, Hercules, Lilo & Stitch, Pirates of the Caribbean, Tangled, Wreck-It Ralph and Frozen.

Description 
Bandai Namco Entertainment officially announced the title in June 2015 by opening an official website. A live stream was hosted on July 6 with additional information being revealed. The game shipped in Japan on November 5. A new 3DS bundle was also revealed, containing the game itself and a specially designed 3DS featuring Mickey Mouse.

Development 
Bandai Namco revealed the game in the summer 2015.

Reception

References 

2015 video games
Bandai Namco games
Crossover video games
Disney video games
Life simulation games
Nintendo 3DS games
Nintendo Switch games
Nintendo 3DS eShop games
Nintendo games
Nintendo Network games
Video games about size change
Video games developed in Japan
Video games featuring protagonists of selectable gender
Video games set in castles
Video game sequels
H.a.n.d. games